The New Taipei City Exhibition Hall is a convention center in Wugu District, New Taipei, Taiwan.

Architecture
The exhibition hall is a three-story building with two-story parking space.

Transportation
The hall is accessible within walking distance north of Xinzhuang Fuduxin Station of Taoyuan Metro.

See also
 Taipei World Trade Center

References

External links
  

Buildings and structures in New Taipei
Convention centers in Taiwan
Tourist attractions in New Taipei